Commander (born September 1, 2021) is a dog owned by President Joe Biden and First Lady Jill Biden. A German Shepherd, Commander was a birthday gift to Joe Biden from James and Sara Biden, his brother and sister-in-law. Commander first came to the White House on December 20, 2021. On February 13, 2022, Commander made his TV debut in the program Puppy Bowl XVIII. White House superintendent Dale Haney, who has taken responsibility for walking presidential dogs since the presidency of Richard Nixon, has been walking Commander.

References

External links

Biden family
United States presidential dogs
German shepherds
2021 animal births